Guzmania subcorymbosa is a plant species in the genus Guzmania. This species is native to Colombia, Panama, and Costa Rica.

References

subcorymbosa
Flora of Costa Rica
Flora of Panama
Flora of Colombia
Plants described in 1937